Edwin Johnson may refer to:

Edwin Johnson (Australian educator) (1835–1894), under-secretary of the Department of Education, New South Wales
Edwin Johnson (historian) (1842–1901), English historian
Edwin Johnson (athlete) (born 1950), Bahamian Olympic sprinter
Edwin S. Johnson (1857–1933), U.S. Senator from South Dakota
Edwin C. Johnson (1884–1970), U.S. Senator and Governor of Colorado
Edwin G. Johnson (1922–1999), U.S. politician for Pennsylvania, in office 1979–1992
Edwin Boyd Johnson (1904–1968), American painter, designer, muralist and photographer
Edwin Beaumont Johnson (1825–1893), British Army officer
Ed Johnson (baseball) (Edwin Cyril Johnson, 1899–1975), American Major League Baseball player
Eddie Johnson (musician) (Edwin Lawrence Johnson, 1920–2010), American jazz and blues tenor saxophonist